Guana may refer to:

Places
 Guana Island, an island in the British Virgin Islands
 Guiana Island, also called Guana Island, off Antigua
 Guana River, in Guana Tolomato Matanzas National Estuarine Research Reserve, in Florida, U.S.

Languages
 Guana language (Brazil), a language of the Brazilian Terêna
 Guana language (Paraguay), a language of the Paraguayan Chaco

Other uses
 Guana people, or Chané, an ethnic group in Paraguay, Bolivia, Argentina, and Brazil
 Roberto Guana (born 1981), footballer

See also
 Guyana (disambiguation)
 Iguana (disambiguation)